Cardal may refer to:

 Cardal, Uruguay
 Cardal Publishing, a British magazine and comic publisher
 Jaroslav Cardal (1919-2010), Czechoslovakian cross country skier

See also

 Cardale (disambiguation)
 Caudal (disambiguation)
 Kardal